Lalheue is a commune in the Saône-et-Loire department in the region of Bourgogne-Franche-Comté in eastern France.

Geography
The Grison, a tributary of the Grosne, forms most of the commune's eastern border. The Grosne flows northeast through the northwestern part of the commune.

See also
Communes of the Saône-et-Loire department

References

Communes of Saône-et-Loire